Sapi-Nangoh Highway, also known as Jalan Sapi-Nangoh, is one of the major highways in Sabah, Malaysia. This highway was constructed to connect the rural areas in northeast Sabah with Kudat and Sandakan, as well as to shorten the traveling distance from Kudat to Sandakan. The highway originally started as a road connecting Kudat to Kota Marudu, Pitas and the nearby areas before being extended southwards.

Because the majority of this highway passes through remote and sparsely populated areas in northeast Sabah, it is reported that after passing the town of Pitas, the next available proper petrol station is more than 200 km. However, petrol can still be obtained in small quantities in remote villages along this highway, but at a higher price than regular petrol stations.

List of interchanges

References

Highways in Malaysia
Roads in Sabah